The Drummondville Transit Commission (la Commission de transport de Drummondville (CTD)) is responsible for public transportation in the city of Drummondville in the Centre-du-Québec region of Quebec, Canada. 

The system consists of five regular bus routes which operate every half-hour on Routes 1, 2, 3 & 4 and once an hour on Route 5, Monday through Wednesday from 7 am to 7 pm and on Thursday and Friday from 7 am to 10 pm. On the weekend the frequency on all routes is hourly and the buses run on Saturday from 8 am to 6 pm and Sunday from noon to 6 pm.

Bus routes
All routes operate out of the main downtown bus terminal at Des Forges and Lindsay Streets.
 1 - Downtown to Drummondville-Sud, along Boul. Mercure (provides service to Hôpital Sainte-Croix)
 2 - Downtown to Drummondville-Nord, along Boul. St-Joseph (provides service to the CEGEP and several large shopping centres)
 3 - Downtown to Drummondville-Nord, along Boul. Des Pins
 4 - Downtown to Quartier St-Jean-Baptiste (provides service to the CEGEP)
 5 - North-South route from Drummondville-Nord (Promenades Drummondville) to Saint-Nicéphore (Place Charpentier)

References

External links
 Commission de transport de Drummondville (CTD)
 Transit History of Quebec communities, Drummondville

Transit agencies in Quebec
Transport in Drummondville